Kronk may refer to:

 Gary W. Kronk (born 1956), American amateur astronomer and writer
 48300 Kronk, an asteroid named after Gary Kronk
 Paul Kronk (born 1965), Australian retired tennis player
 Kronk Gym, a former boxing gym in Detroit headed by legendary trainer Emanuel Steward
 Kronk Pepikrankenitz, a character in the animated film The Emperor's New Groove (2000) and its sequel, Kronk's New Groove (2005)

See also
 Krunk (disambiguation)
 Crunk (disambiguation)